Chu Bo (born October 1944) is a retired Chinese politician. He served as the Chinese Communist Party Secretary for the Inner Mongolia Autonomous Region, the top leader of the region, holding position from 2001 to 2009. He also served as Governor of Hunan Province between 1998 and 2001.

Biography
Chu is a native of Tongcheng, Anhui where he attended the Anhui Province Tongcheng Secondary School. He graduated from the department of hydraulics at Tianjin University in 1967, then joined the Communist Party in 1969.  He began work at a chemical factory in Yueyang, Hunan. He rose through the administrative ranks, eventually entering politics, first as vice mayor and deputy party chief of Yueyang, then party chief. In October 1990 he was named a member of the provincial Party Standing Committee of Hunan. In January 1993 he became executive vice governor of Hunan. In 1994, he was named deputy party chief of Hunan province.  In October 1998, he was named acting governor of Fujian, confirmed as governor in February 1999.

Chu became the top official of Inner Mongolia in August 2001, taking office as its party secretary, and took on a unique approach to policy. During his tenure, Inner Mongolia's GDP increased at a much higher rate compared to the rest of the country. At its height real GDP growth was measured at 17%. Chu's obsession with GDP growth, however, cost some essential benefits for most of the region's poor. Although his administration gave rise to the slogan, "for economic development, China leads the world, Inner Mongolia leads China", his policies were said to have created a gross wealth imbalance within the region.

In November 2009, Chu, having reached the customary retirement age of 65 for provincial level officials, left his post as party secretary of Inner Mongolia. On December 26, 2009, Chu was named a deputy chair of the National People's Congress Financial and Economic Affairs Committee. He served out one term before retiring from politics.

Chu was an alternate member of the 15th Central Committee of the Chinese Communist Party, and a full member of the 16th and 17th Central Committees.

References

Living people
1944 births
People from Tongcheng, Anhui
Governors of Hunan
Political office-holders in Inner Mongolia
People's Republic of China politicians from Anhui
Chinese Communist Party politicians from Anhui
Tianjin University alumni
Politicians from Anqing